Letters to Olga (Czech:Dopisy Olze) is a book compiled from letters written by Czech playwright, dissident, and future president, Václav Havel to his wife Olga Havlová during his nearly four-year imprisonment from May 1979 to March 1983. (Havel was released when he came down with a high fever and received a medical discharge.) Havel was imprisoned by the communist government of then Czechoslovakia for being one of the leaders of The Committee for the Defense of the Unjustly Prosecuted (VONS) – most of whom had been signatories of the human rights document Charter 77.

Author Salman Rushdie stated in a 1999 interview, that Letters to Olga was among a small handful of books that he carried with him living in secret locations during the years he was hiding from possible execution.

See also
 Olga Havlová

References

Works by Václav Havel
1988 non-fiction books
Collections of letters